Rolands is a Latvian masculine given name. It is the Latvian spelling of Roland and may refer to:
Rolands Bērziņš (born 1975), Latvian chess International Master
Rolands Broks (born 1969), Latvian politician
Rolands Bulders (born 1965), Latvian footballer
Rolands Freimanis (born 1988), Latvian basketball player 
Rolands Kalniņš (1922-2022), Latvian film director
Rolands Rikards, Latvian scientist, preofessor and politician
Rolands Šmits (born 1995), Latvian basketball player
Rolands Štrobinders (born 1992), Latvian javelin thrower
Rolands Upatnieks (1932–1994), Latvian luger

References

Latvian masculine given names